Monopis weaverella is a species of moth in the family Tineidae. It is found in most of Europe and North America.

The wingspan is 13–18 mm. Adults are on wing from May to August.

The larvae are scavengers on animal carcasses and faeces.

References

Moths described in 1858
Tineinae
Moths of Europe